One Dollar and a Tomb is a 1970 Argentinian western film directed by León Klimovsky, produced by José Frade, written by Pedro Gil Paradela, scored by Francesco De Masi, and starring Robert Woods, John Ireland, Roberto Camardiel and Annabella Incontrera.

Cast

References

External links
 

Films directed by León Klimovsky
Argentine Western (genre) films
1970 Western (genre) films
1970 films
Films scored by Francesco De Masi
Films with screenplays by Edoardo Mulargia
Films shot in Italy